James Alonzo Stahle (January 11, 1829 – December 21, 1912) was a Republican member of the U.S. House of Representatives from Pennsylvania.

Early life
Stahle was born in West Manchester Township, York County, Pennsylvania. He attended the common schools and York Academy. He learned the printing trade and later became a merchant tailor.

Career
During the American Civil War, he organized the Ellsworth Zouaves in 1861 and in August of that year, together with his company of forty recruits, enlisted as Company A, 87th Pennsylvania Infantry; Stahle rose to the rank of lieutenant colonel. He served until discharged in 1864.

He served as deputy collector of internal revenue at York, Pennsylvania, from 1869 to 1885.  He also engaged in agricultural pursuits.

Stahle was elected as a Republican to the Fifty-fourth Congress.  He was not a candidate for renomination in 1896.  He resumed agricultural pursuits.

Death
Stahle died on his estate at Emigsville near York in 1912. He was interred in Prospect Hill Cemetery in York.

References
 Retrieved on 2008-02-15
The Political Graveyard

External links

Union Army officers
Politicians from York, Pennsylvania
1829 births
1912 deaths
People of Pennsylvania in the American Civil War
Republican Party members of the United States House of Representatives from Pennsylvania
19th-century American politicians